Joline Beam is an American politician from Lewiston, Maine. A former member of the Maine House of Representatives, Beam now serves on the Lewiston City Council.

References

Year of birth missing (living people)
Living people
Democratic Party members of the Maine House of Representatives
Lewiston, Maine City Council members
Women city councillors in Maine
21st-century American women